The Jazz Workshop was a jazz music nightclub in San Francisco, located in North Beach at 473 Broadway Street. Numerous live recordings were made there, during its heyday in the 1960s. As of 2016, the space is occupied by a bar and music venue called "Monroe".

Albums
Jazz Workshop Revisited Cannonball Adderley (Capital 1962)
Live at the Jazz Workshop Thelonious Monk (Columbia 1964)
Barry Harris at the Jazz Workshop (Riverside 1960)
Right Now: Live at the Jazz Workshop Charles Mingus (Debut 1964)
Brother Jack at the Jazz Workshop Live! Jack McDuff (Prestige 1964)
Naked City Theme Ahmad Jamal (Argo 1964)
Cookin' the Blues James Moody (Cadet 1965)
Inta' Somethin'  Kenny Dorham (Pacific Jazz 1962)
Speak Brother Speak Max Roach (Fantasy 1963)
''Cannonball Adderley In San Francisco (Riverside 1959)

References

Music of the San Francisco Bay Area
Nightclubs in San Francisco
Jazz clubs in the San Francisco Bay Area
Albums recorded at the Jazz Workshop